The Southern Association Most Valuable Player Award (MVP) was an annual award given to the best player in Minor League Baseball's Southern Association based on their regular season performance. Though the league was established in 1901, the award was not created until 1937. It continued to be issued through the 1957 season, though the league continued operation until after the 1961 season.

Nine outfielders won the MVP Award, the most of any position. Catchers, with three winners, won the most among infielders, followed by first basemen, second baseman, and third baseman (2). Four pitchers also won the award. 

Eight players from the Nashville Vols were selected for the MVP Award, more than any other team in the league, followed by the Atlanta Crackers (4); the Memphis Chicks (3); the Little Rock Travelers and Mobile Bears (2); and the Chattanooga Lookouts, Knoxville Smokies, and New Orleans Pelicans (1).

Four players from the Chicago Cubs Major League Baseball (MLB) organization won the MVP Award, more than any other, followed by the Brooklyn Dodgers, Cleveland Indians, New York Giants, and Pittsburgh Pirates organizations (2); the Chicago White Sox, Cincinnati Reds, Detroit Tigers, St. Louis Browns, and Washington Senators organizations (1). Five players were from teams unaffiliated with any MLB organization.

Key

Winners

Wins by team

Wins by organization

References
Specific

General

Southern Association
Minor league baseball trophies and awards
Minor league baseball MVP award winners
Awards established in 1937
Awards disestablished in 1957